Christiana is a genus of flowering plants in the family Malvaceae. 

Species accepted by the Plants of the World Online as of September 2021: 
Christiana africana 
Christiana eburnea 
Christiana macrodon 
Christiana mennegae 
Christiana vescoana

References

Malvaceae genera
Taxonomy articles created by Polbot
Brownlowioideae